Pirro Imperoli (1554–1617) was a Roman Catholic prelate who served as Bishop of Jesi (1604–1617).

Biography
Pirro Imperoli was born in Verulan, Italy in 1554.
On 28 January 1604, he was appointed during the papacy of Pope Clement VIII as Bishop of Jesi.
On 8 February 1604, he was consecrated bishop by Camillo Borghese, Cardinal-Priest of San Crisogono, with Guglielmo Bastoni, Bishop of Pavia, and Sebastiano Ghislieri, Bishop of Strongoli, serving as co-consecrators. 
He served as Bishop of Jesi until his death in 1617.

References

External links and additional sources
 (for Chronology of Bishops) 
 (for Chronology of Bishops) 

17th-century Italian Roman Catholic bishops
Bishops appointed by Pope Clement VIII
1554 births
1617 deaths